Victorian Railways No.1 was the first government passenger steam locomotive on Victorian Railways, built by George England & Co. The engine was 2-2-2 configuration tender engine built in 1857-8 with builders numbers 146. The engine arrived in Port Phillip in September 1858 along with 4 goods locomotive of 0-6-0 tender configuration.

The small 2-2-2 passenger engine was quite successful over easier runs and five more were ordered in May 1860. During 1871 it was converted to 2-4-0 configuration to handle heavier loads and steeper gradients on the newer lines.

The first system used by Victorian Railways of identifying the locomotives was consecutive numbering from 1 onwards for both passenger and goods locomotives; so the goods engines were numbered 1-4 and the passenger engine No.1. This numbering was later superseded by the introduction of the system of allotting odd numbers starting from 1 for goods locomotives, and even numbers starting from 2 for passenger locos. This system remained in use until 1912. It was expedient to begin the odds and evens series with the J Class with the goods locos numbered 11-17 (Odds only) and passenger loco numbered 12.

In the 1886 identification system engine No. 12 remained unclassed. Number 12 was sold, to the Yarrawonga Council for use on the Katamatite tramway, then bought back and renumbered because other engines had taken its number in the meantime. Numbers 12 became number 528.

References

Specific

External links
 Victorian Railway's first passenger engine of 1857 later in working life, circa late-1890s

2-2-2 locomotives
2-4-0 locomotives
No.1 1857
Railway locomotives introduced in 1859
Broad gauge locomotives in Australia
Scrapped locomotives
George England and Company locomotives